Parang, officially the Municipality of Parang (Tausūg: Kawman sin Parang), is a 2nd class municipality in the province of Sulu, Philippines. According to the 2020 census, it has a population of 71,495 people.

Geography

Barangays
Parang is politically subdivided into 40 barangays.

Climate

Demographics

Economy

References

External links
Parang Profile at PhilAtlas.com
[ Philippine Standard Geographic Code]
  Parang Profile at the DTI Cities and Municipalities Competitive Index
Philippine Census Information
Local Governance Performance Management System

Municipalities of Sulu